Tales from the Leather Nun was an American underground comic published by Last Gasp in 1973. It was a one-shot anthology of bizarre, violent, and perverted stories featuring nuns by Dave Sheridan, Robert Crumb, Spain Rodriguez, Jaxon, Roger Brand, and Pat Ryan.

The complete Leather Nun adventures by Dave Sheridan were reprinted in Dave Sheridan: Life with Dealer McDope, The Leather Nun, and The Fabulous Furry Freak Brothers (Fantagraphics Underground, 2018).

In popular culture 
Deborah Harry is seen reading the comic in the 1991 movie Intimate Stranger.

References

Notes

Sources 
 Gravett, Paul with Peter Stanbury. The Leather Nun and Other Incredibly Strange Comics (Aurum Press September 2008), .

1973 comics debuts
1973 comics endings
American comics
Comics critical of religion
Nuns in fiction
One-shot comic titles
Underground comix